Melaleuca hemisticta, commonly known as Mount Wheeler bottlebrush is a plant in the myrtle family, Myrtaceae and is endemic to coastal areas of Queensland. (Some Australian state herbaria continue to use the name Callistemon hemistictus.) It is a tall, bushy shrub with dark green leaves and red flowers spikes tipped with yellow.

Description

The flowers are arranged in spikes on the ends of branches which continue to grow after flowering and sometimes on the sides of the branches. There are 35-53 stamens in each flower with red filaments and yellow anthers.

Taxonomy and naming
Melaleuca hemisticta was first formally described in 2006 by Lyndley Craven in Novon. The specific epithet (hemisticta) is from Greek meaning "half" and "spotted", referring to the oil glands in the leaves being only in the lower half of the leaf.

Callistemon hemistictus is regarded as a synonym of Melaleuca hemisticta by the Royal Botanic Gardens, Kew.

Distribution and habitat
Melaleuca hemisticta occurs in coastal Queensland in and between the Bowen and Bundaberg regions, on nearby islands and on Mount Stewart near Townsville, where it grows in a range of habitats but often on the sides of cliffs.

References

hemisticta
Flora of Queensland
Plants described in 2006
Taxa named by Lyndley Craven